The Palani Hills are a mountain range in the southern Indian states of Kerala and Tamil Nadu. The Palani Hills are an eastward extension of the Western Ghats ranges, which run parallel to the west coast of India. The highest part of the range is in the southwest, and reaches 1,800-2,500 metres (5,906-8,202 feet) elevation; the eastern extension of the range is made up of hills 1,000-1,500 m (3,281-4,921 ft) high.

It is also home to the main temple of Lord Muruga, who is worshipped as the primary god in Tamil Nadu.

Geography

Vandaravu peak is the highest peak in the Palani hills. The range lies between the Cumbum Valley on the south, which is drained by the Vaigai River and its upper tributaries, and the Kongunadu region to the north. The northern slopes are drained by the Shanmukha River, Nanganji River, and Kodavanar River, which are tributaries of the Kaveri River. The range lies mostly within Dindigul district, except in the western portion, where it forms the boundary between Dindigul district and Theni district to the south and Idukki District to the south west. The hill station of Kodaikanal lies in the southern central portion of the range. Palani Hills joined with Anamalai Hills and Cardamom Hills at Anamudi peak in Kerala state.

Ecoregions

The lower elevations of the Palani Hills, between 250 and 1,000 m (820-3,281 ft), are part of the South Western Ghats moist deciduous forests ecoregion. Above 1,000 m (3,281 ft), the deciduous forests transition to the evergreen South Western Ghats montane rain forests. In the highest portions of the range, above 2,000 m (6,562 ft), the montane rainforests give way to shola-grassland mosaic, made up of frost-tolerant montane grasslands interspersed with pockets of stunted shola forests. The hills extend into Kerala as Pampadum Shola National Park.

Conservation
The Palani Hills are currently subject to increasing development pressure as it is under developed for a long time. The Palani Hills Conservation Council, a non-governmental organization headquartered in Kodaikanal, was founded in 1985. In the early 1990s the Tamil Nadu Forest Department proposed to the Tamil Nadu state government that much of the range be granted protected status as a wildlife sanctuary or Palani Hills Wildlife Sanctuary and National Park.

Gallery

References

External links

 Palni Hills Conservation Council

Montane grasslands and shrublands
Grasslands of India
Hills of Tamil Nadu